Laelia superbiens is a species of orchid native to Mexico, Guatemala and Honduras.

References

External links 

superbiens
Orchids of Guatemala
Orchids of Honduras
Orchids of Mexico